Jason Cullen Green (born October 24, 1976), better known as Planet Asia, is a rapper from Fresno, California. He is prominent for being one half of the now reunited hip-hop duo the Cali Agents and is currently a member of the groups Gold Chain Military and Durag Dynasty. He is also well known for his vast discography of mixtapes.

History
Originally from Fresno, California, Planet Asia moved to the San Francisco Bay Area in 1998 and began working with local producer, Fanatik. Between 1997 and 2001, Planet Asia released several 12" singles, including "Definition of Ill" (Stones Throw) and "Place of Birth" (ABB Records). He reached full acclaim in 2001 when The Source gave him the First Round Draft Pick and Independent Album of the Year awards for How the West Was One. How The West Was One was recorded with fellow rapper Rasco under the group name Cali Agents and landed him a deal with Interscope Records. While signed to Interscope Records, Planet Asia was not promoted much and stayed with Interscope until 2003 without releasing an album. He was nominated for a Grammy Award in 2002 for the song "W" by Mystic.

In 2003, Avatar Records signed Planet Asia and in 2004 released Planet Asia's debut album, The Grand Opening, to positive feedback. It earned him another Independent Album of the Year award from The Source. Avatar also released 12" vinyl records including "Summertime In The City" b/w "G's & Soldiers" featuring Kurupt produced by J. Wells, "Its All Big" b/w "Right or Wrong", and "Real Niggaz" featuring Ghostface. His record "G's & Soldiers" featuring Kurupt was prominently featured in John Travolta's 2005 film Be Cool released by MGM.

After leaving Avatar, Planet Asia started his own record label, Gold Chain Music, with Walt Liquor. His next album, The Medicine, was released on October 3, 2006, on ABB Records and produced by Evidence of Dilated Peoples, along with co-production credits from The Alchemist, Nucleus and Bravo. On June 26, 2007, he released "The Jewelry Box Sessions: The Album" on Gold Chain Music. The album featured the single "Havin' Things" and in 2010, he collaborated with Malaysian artist, Mizz Nina, on a song called Hope. In 2011, Planet Asia was a judge on the Ultimate MC TV show alongside Royce da 5'9", Sean Price, Organik, and Pharoahe Monch.

Personal life
Planet Asia is a member of the Five Percent Nation

Discography

Solo albums
 1999: Still in Training
 2002: The Grand Opening
 2006: The Medicine
 2007: Jewelry Box Sessions: The Album
 2010: Crack Belt Theatre
 2012: Black Belt Theatre
 2016: Egyptian Merchandise
 2017: Dirty Planet
 2018: The Golden Buddha
 2018: Mansa Musa
 2019: Initials on my Jewelry
 2020: Bodhidharma
 2021: Block Shaman
 2021: Holy Water
 2021: Rule of Thirds

EPs
 1998: Planet Asias
 2000: The Last that Stand 2011: The Bar Mitzvah 2014: Zapco Exp 2016: Asiatic Prince 2017: Velour Portraits 2019: Medallions 2019: AGE: All Gold Everything 2020: Arctic Plus Degrees: The Sun Don't Chill AllahAs Cali Agents
2000: How the West Was One (Ground Control)
2004: Head of the State (Pockets Linted/Groove Attack)
2006: Fire & Ice (Pockets Linted Entertainment)

Collaboration albums
 1997: Representation (EP) - 
 2002: A New Way of Thinking 
 2008: Planet F.L.O. 
 2008: Pain Language 
 2008: Pain Language: The Mixtape 
 2010: Chain of Command 
 2011: Camouflage Jackets 
 2011: Cracks in the Vinyl (EP) 
 2011: Each Step becomes Elevated 
 2012: Everyday Is Christmas (EP) 
 2012: Respeta at Santa Barbarie (EP) 
 2012: The Arrival 
 2013: Abrasions 
 2013: The 2nd Coming 
 2013: High End Cloths (EP) 
 2013: 360 Waves 
 2014: Via Satellite 
 2015: The Tonight Show: Starring Planet Asia 
 2015: 2010 A.D. (EP) 
 2015: Nautica Nagas 
 2016: Seventy Nine 
 2017: Anchovies 
 2017: Unfinished & Untitled 
 2019: Blak Majic 
 2019: Jackpot 
 2019: The Planet Asia & Milano Constantine EP 
 2020: Yard to the Last Song (EP) 
 2020: Trust the Chain (EP) 
 2020: Cashmere Corners (EP) 
 2020: Camo Jackets 
 2020: Pharoah Chain 
 2021: No Exit Plans (EP) 
 2022: Duffle Gods (EP) 
 2022: Heist the Crown (EP) 
 2022: U.z.i. Universal Zeitgeist Intelligence''

Guest appearances

References

External links
Planet Asia's Official Website
Discography

Rappers from the San Francisco Bay Area
Five percenters
African-American male rappers
Living people
1976 births
Musicians from Fresno, California
Underground rappers
21st-century American rappers
21st-century American male musicians
21st-century African-American musicians
20th-century African-American musicians